Caribbomerus charynae is a species of beetle in the family Cerambycidae. It was described by Micheli in 2003.

References

Graciliini
Beetles described in 2003